Richard Anthony Fowler (born January 9, 1987) is an American radio show host, media personality, and a liberal political activist.  Fowler is the host of the nationally syndicated liberal talk radio program, The Richard Fowler Show. , he is serving as a Fox News contributor, where he appears as a regular guest co-host on The Five and appears on several shows across the network.

Career 

Fowler has been a featured speaker at the Energy Action Coalition PowerShift Conference, the Microsoft Policy Solution Center, over twenty different foreign delegations, and numerous colleges and universities.

Fowler served as the Policy and Advocacy Director for the Young Democrats of America from 2011 to 2013. Fowler was a 2012 Democratic National Convention delegate for the state of Virginia.

From 2011 to 2013, Fowler worked on the DC Public Charter School Board.

On January 7, 2016, Fowler was made a Senior Media Fellow for the New Leaders Council, a non-profit organization that works to recruit, train, and promote young progressive leaders, ranging from elected officials to civically-engaged leaders in business and industry. As a senior fellow, Fowler advises on the media, in addition to electoral messaging and training.

Fowler came out as gay.

The Richard Fowler Show 

The Richard Fowler Show is a nationally syndicated weekly liberal radio show that can be heard in over 8.1 million homes.

Radio and television appearances 

Aside from his work hosting The Fowler Show, Fowler is a political commentator. Fowler has appeared on Fox News, MSNBC, Fox Business, and C-SPAN, as well as local outlets across the country. Additionally, Fowler has been featured on international outlets, such as: RT, CTV, CNTV, NDTV, NHK, Al Jazeera Englis, and ITV. Fowler was also a regular fill-in morning anchor on Current TV.  On October 31, 2013, Fowler appeared on Politicking with Larry King to discuss the topic "Did The U.S. Spy On Its Allies?" alongside Rep. Adam Schiff (D-CA-28) and Rep. Lee Terry (R-NE-2).

References

External links 

 

1987 births
American political activists
American talk radio hosts
Living people
People from Fort Lauderdale, Florida
American LGBT journalists